The Principal Secretary of State, or Principal Secretary of the Council, was a government office in the Kingdom of Ireland. It was abolished in 1801 when Ireland became part of the United Kingdom of Great Britain and Ireland under the Acts of Union 1800.

The post was created in May 1560 by the Lord Deputy of Ireland, Thomas Radclyffe, 3rd Earl of Sussex. Sussex created the role to help re-establish English governance in Ireland, as part of the wider Tudor conquest of Ireland. The role was modelled in part on the role of Secretary of State in England, and was intended to be distinct from the clerks of the Irish Privy Council or the Governors Private Secretary. Whilst the nature of the role evolved other time, originally the holder was expected to:
 chair the Privy Council of Ireland
 engage in regular full correspondence with the crown

Other, less common functions included:
 directing clerks of the Privy Council of Ireland
 charging treasons and seditious libels
 ordering the Postmaster General of Ireland to open letters
 offering advice on matters of state to the chief governor of Ireland (Lord Deputy, later Lord Lieutenant)

In part due to the absence of the Southwells during their time in the role, it became largely ceremonial, with more correspondence being managed directly by the Lord Lieutenant and his Chief Secretary, or alternatively the Lords Justices (who themselves became defunct after 1765). Richard Cooke, for instance, acted as both Chancellor of the Exchequer of Ireland and Secretary of State at the same time. The last three Secretaries of State also held the more powerful position of Chief Secretary. No Secretary of State was appointed after the 1800 Acts of Union; in 1802 the last appointee resigned to become Speaker of the UK House of Commons.

List of Secretaries

 by 1576: John Chalenor
 1581: Sir Geoffrey Fenton and another
 1603: Sir Richard Cooke
 1612: Sir Dudley Norton
 1616: Francis Annesley, 1st Baron Mountnorris
 1634: Philip Mainwaring
 1661: Sir Paul Davys (granted the office in reversion after Mainwaring)
 1665: George Lane, 1st Viscount Lanesborough (in reversion after Davys)
 1678: Sir John Davys (in reversion after Lane)
 1690: Sir Robert Southwell
 1702: Edward Southwell Sr.
 1730: Edward Southwell Jr. 
 1746: Edward Weston
 1755: Thomas Carter
 1763: Philip Tisdall
 1766: John Hely-Hutchinson (in reversion, succeeded 1777)
 1796: Thomas Pelham 
 Baron Glentworth (1795–97) and Lord Castlereagh (1797–1801) were Keeper of the Signet or Privy Seal of Ireland during Pelham's term; other Secretaries of State held the office of Keeper simultaneously)
 1801: Charles Abbot (vacated office in 1802 when appointed  Speaker of the UK Commons)

See also

 Privy Council of Ireland
 Chief Secretary for Ireland
 Secretary of State (United Kingdom)

References

Early Modern Ireland
Political office-holders in pre-partition Ireland